Lone is a given name. Notable people with this name include:

 Lone Droscher Nielsen (born 1964), Danish wildlife conservationist 
 Lone Dybkjær (1940–2020), Danish politician
 Lone Fischer (born 1988), German handball player
 Lone Fleming (born 1945), Danish actress appearing in Spanish films
 Lone Frank (born 1966), Danish science journalist
 Lone Hertz (born 1939), Danish film actress
 Lone Høyer Hansen (born 1950), Danish sculptor
 Lone Mathiesen (born 1972), Danish handball player
 Lone Smidt Nielsen (born 1961), Danish footballer
 Lone Scherfig (born 1959), Danish film director and screenwriter 
 Lone Wiggers (born 1963), Danish architect

Danish feminine given names